is a private junior college in Miyazaki, Miyazaki, Japan.

The junior college was founded in 1965 as a coeducational college, but later became women-only. From April 1, 1999, it became coeducational again. It offers courses in international studies.

See also 
 List of junior colleges in Japan

External links
 Official website 
  

Private universities and colleges in Japan
Universities and colleges in Miyazaki Prefecture
Educational institutions established in 1965
Japanese junior colleges
1965 establishments in Japan